The 1999 Slough Borough Council election was held on 6 May 1999, at the same time as other local elections across Britain. Fourteen of the 41 seats on Slough Borough Council were up for election, being the usual third of the council (13 seats) plus a by-election in Upton ward, where Labour councillor Mark Drapes had resigned.

Results
The elected councillors were:

Notes:-
 * Member of the Britwellian, Independent, Liberal and Liberal Democrat Group (BILLD) after the 2000 election.
 (a) Sandhu: Formerly served as a councillor 1996–1997
 (b) Dawson: Formerly served as a councillor 1988–1992 and 1996–1997
 (c) Simmons: Formerly served as a councillor 1979–1994 
 (d) Mansell: Formerly served as a councillor 1983–1990
 (e) Jones: Formerly served as a councillor 1973–1979
 (f) Collins: Elected to fill a vacancy caused by the resignation of Mark Drapes (Lab)

References

Slough
1999 English local elections
1999